Crevice Cave is a cave located in Perry County in the state of Missouri. It is the longest cave in Missouri and one of the longest caves in the United States.

Geology 
Speleothems in the cave have been used to determine climate changes in the period stretching from 25,000 to 75,000 years ago, as well as to document periods of cave flooding during the Holocene epoch.

Length 
It is the longest cave in Missouri and the 8th or 11th longest cave in the United States.

In 1984 the cave was measured to be 28.20 miles (over 48,000 meters or 45.37 kilometers) long. The Missouri Speleological Survey suggests the cave is more than 31.2 miles long.

References 

Caves of Missouri
Geography of Perry County, Missouri